Alexey Sitnikov (June 19, 1971, Krasnoye-na-Volge, Kostroma Oblast) is a Russian political figure, deputy of the 8th State Duma. 

From 2004 to 2016, Sitnikov was the deputy of the Kostroma Oblast Duma of the 3rd, 4th, 5th and 6th convocations. In 2011, he was elected deputy of the 6th State Duma. In 2016 and 2021, he was re-elected for the 7th and 8th State Dumas.

References

1971 births
Living people
United Russia politicians
21st-century Russian politicians
Eighth convocation members of the State Duma (Russian Federation)